Paiute language may refer to any of the languages spoken by the Paiute people:

 Northern Paiute language, also known as Numu and Paviotso
 Mono language (California), specifically the Western dialect, also known as Owens Valley Paiute
 Colorado River Numic language, also known as Ute, Southern Paiute, Ute–Southern Paiute, or Ute-Chemehuevi